Arwa is a bottled water brand produced by Dubai-based Al Ahlia Group, the licensed bottler and distributor of Coca-Cola brands in the UAE and Oman. It is sold across most Middle East countries. Arwa water is produced in-house at the company's Al Ain Plant since 1990.
also has a plant in Tulkarem, West Bank

"Arwa Fruits", a sparkling water variant, was launched in Bahrain in 2010. It comes in two natural flavors: strawberry and lemon.

"Arwa" is an Arabic feminine given name. It means "quenched", "pleasant", "fresh". It could also mean "mountain goat" or "deer".

References

External links
 Official site
 Arwa Water on Twitter Facebook Instagram

Bottled water brands
Coca-Cola brands